Walsinghamiella is a genus of moths in the family Pterophoridae.

Species
Walsinghamiella eques (Walsingham, 1891)
Walsinghamiella illustris (Townsend, 1958)
Walsinghamiella prolai (Gibeaux, 1994)
Walsinghamiella vibrans (Meyrick, 1921)

Pterophorinae
Moth genera